Guaynabo Gol SC is a Puerto Rican association football club from Guaynabo that currently plays in the Liga Puerto Rico.

History
Guaynabo Gol SC joined the nascent Liga Puerto Rico for its inaugural season in 2018/19. It went on to finish in fourth place of eight teams. The club began the 2019/20 campaign which was eventually abandoned because of the COVID-19 pandemic.

Domestic history
Key

References

External links
Facebook profile
Liga Puerto Rico profile
Soccerway profile

Football clubs in Puerto Rico
Association football clubs established in 2007
2007 establishments in Puerto Rico